Diplognatha gagates is a species of beetle belonging to the family Scarabaeidae, Cetoniinae subfamily.

Description
The thorax is very convex. The surface is shining black or reddish. Larvae feed on bird droppings. Young adults are usually reddish brown and feed on flowers, fruits and sap.

Distribution
This species is widespread in almost all African countries south of Sahara.

Subspecies
 Diplognatha gagates holoserica Bainbridge, 1842 (West Africa, Mali,  Sénégal, Burkina Faso, Nigeria)
 Diplognatha gagates silicea MacLeay, 1838 (Namibia, Republic of South Africa, Mozambique)

References

 Organism Names
 Mike Picker,Charles Griffiths,Alan Weaving - Field guide to insects of South Africa

External links
 Catalogue of Life
 Beetlespace

Cetoniinae
Beetles described in 1771
Taxa named by Johann Reinhold Forster